Balagas River is a river of northern Ethiopia. A tributary of the Tekezé, its own tributaries include the Balessa and Dorana rivers.

See also 
 Rivers of Ethiopia

References

Atbarah River
Rivers of Ethiopia